The Mafersa coaches are a class of 38 passenger railroad cars built by Brazilian manufacturer Mafersa. Originally built for Virginia Railway Express, they are currently operated by Connecticut Department of Transportation and QIT-Fer et Titane.

History
Mafersa built the coaches new for the Virginia Railway Express at $24.7 million. VRE sold 33 of the coaches to the Connecticut Department of Transportation in 2004 for its Shore Line East service. QIT-Fer et Titane, a Quebec mining company, purchased the remaining five cars in 2008.

Routes served
In Connecticut, Mafersa coaches are used by CT Rail on their Hartford Line service. They are operated from New Haven, Connecticut, to Springfield, Massachusetts. These cars were previously used in Shore Line East service, but when Kawasaki M8s took over service on the line, they were moved to the Hartford Line.

References

External links
 

Passenger rail transportation in Virginia
Metro-North Railroad